Whiteshield Mountain is located on the border of Alberta and British Columbia. It was named in 1924 because of the ice and snow on the east side of the mountain.

See also
 List of peaks on the Alberta–British Columbia border
 Mountains of Alberta
 Mountains of British Columbia

References

Whiteshield Mountain
Whiteshield Mountain
Canadian Rockies